Ardtalnaig is a hamlet on the south shore of Loch Tay in Perth and Kinross in Scotland.

Climate

References

Villages in Perth and Kinross